Torsten Ludvig Hammarström (10 June 1896 – 9 May 1965) was a Swedish diplomat.

Career
Hammarström was born in Stockholm, Sweden, the son of county governor Alexis Hammarström and his wife Maria (née Engellau). He received a Candidate of Law degree from Uppsala University in 1920 and a Bachelor of Arts degree in 1921 before he became an attaché at the Ministry for Foreign Affairs in 1921. Hammarström served in Berlin in 1922, Chicago in 1923, at the Foreign Ministry in 1925 and in Helsinki in 1927. He was second secretary in 1928, second legation secretary in Brussels and The Hague in 1929, first secretary at the Foreign Ministry in 1931 and in Berlin 1935.

Hammarström was head of the Foreign Ministry's agency for inheritance and compensation matters in 1936, the trade department's first agency in 1939 and was legation counsellor in Rome in 1940. He was an expert and representative of trade negotiations with Germany in 1940 and Italy from 1941 to 1944. Hammarström was sent as envoy to Prague just after the war was over, with the task to reopen the Swedish embassy, which had been closed during the Nazi occupation. Hammarström stayed as envoy in Prague to 1947 and was then ambassador in Nanking from 1947 to 1950.

In May 1950, Sweden and China established diplomatic relations. Sweden was the first Western country to found such relations with the newly established People's Republic and for this reason, chairman Mao Zedong decided to personally receive the Swedish ambassador, Torsten Hammarström, when presenting his letter of credentials which was quite unusual, and a sign that China attached great importance to this diplomatic breakthrough. Hammarström was ambassador in Beijing from 1950 to 1951 as well as being accredited as envoy in Bangkok and Manila from 1947 to 1951. Hammarström was envoy in Bern from 1951 to 1957 and ambassador in Bern from 1957 to 1962.

Personal life

Hammarström died in 1965 and was buried in Norra begravningsplatsen in Stockholm.

Awards
Hammarström's awards:
Commanders Grand Cross of the Order of the Polar Star
Grand Officer of the Order of the Crown of Italy
Commander of the Order of the White Rose of Finland
Commander of the Order of Saints Maurice and Lazarus
Commander of the Order of Orange-Nassau
Commander of the Order of the German Eagle
Officer of the Order of the Crown
Officer of the Order of the Three Stars
Knight of the Order of Leopold
Knight of the Order of Civil Merit

References

1896 births
1965 deaths
Ambassadors of Sweden to Czechoslovakia
Ambassadors of Sweden to China
Ambassadors of Sweden to Thailand
Ambassadors of Sweden to the Philippines
Ambassadors of Sweden to Switzerland
Uppsala University alumni
People from Stockholm
Commanders Grand Cross of the Order of the Polar Star
Commanders of the Order of Saints Maurice and Lazarus
Commanders of the Order of Orange-Nassau
Officers of the Order of the Crown (Belgium)
Order of Civil Merit members
Burials at Norra begravningsplatsen